Pindjur or pinjur or pinđur is a relish form and is commonly used as a summer spread. Pindjur is commonly prepared in Bosnia and Herzegovina, Croatia, Bulgaria, Serbia and North Macedonia.

The traditional ingredients include red bell peppers, tomatoes, garlic, vegetable oil, and salt. Pindjur is similar to ajvar, but the latter is generally made with eggplant. In some regions the words are used interchangeably.

The creation of this traditional relish is a rather long process which involves baking some of the ingredients for hours, as well as roasting the peppers and peeling them.

See also

 Kyopolou, a similar relish in Bulgarian and Turkish cuisines
 Ljutenica, a similar relish in Bulgarian, Macedonian and Serbian cuisines
 Zacuscă, a similar relish in Romanian cuisine
 Malidzano
 List of eggplant dishes
 List of dips
 List of sauces
 List of spreads

Bulgarian cuisine
Serbian cuisine
Croatian cuisine
Macedonian cuisine
Condiments
Eggplant dishes